Mariano "Mario" González Lugo (born August 15, 1969, in Puebla) is a Mexican former boxer who represented his native country at the 1988 Summer Olympics in Seoul, South Korea. There he won the bronze medal in the flyweight division.

He now resides in California, United States.

Olympic results 
1st round bye
Defeated Teboho Mathibeli (Lesotho) 5-0
Defeated Manoj Pingale (Indonesia) 4-1
Defeated Alfred Kotey (Ghana) Walkover
Lost to Andreas Tews (East Germany) 0-5

External links
 

1969 births
Living people
People from Puebla (city)
Flyweight boxers
Boxers at the 1987 Pan American Games
Pan American Games competitors for Mexico
Boxers at the 1988 Summer Olympics
Olympic boxers of Mexico
Olympic bronze medalists for Mexico
Boxers from Puebla
Olympic medalists in boxing
Mexican male boxers
Medalists at the 1988 Summer Olympics
20th-century Mexican people
21st-century Mexican people